María del Puy Alonso González (1941 – 25 November 2015), known artistically as María del Puy, was a Spanish actress.

Biography

Cinema
With some incursions into the cinema, her career was developed mainly in theater and television. On the big screen she worked under Edgar Neville in My Street (1960), with Luis César Amadori in My Last Tango (1960), and Fernando Fernán Gómez in Yo la vi primero (1974).

Theater

Dubbing
Beginning in 1956 she dubbed the voices of some of the most distinguished stars of international cinema, such as Shirley MacLaine, Liza Minnelli, Geraldine Chaplin, Ingrid Bergman, Jane Fonda, Katharine Hepburn, and Jaclyn Smith in the first season of Charlie's Angels.

Radio

Television
Finally, she developed a prolific career in television, especially in the 1960s and 70s, during the apogee of televised theater. Her work on the small screen earned her the Ondas Award in 1963.

Appearances

References

External links
 
 María del Puy at eldoblaje.com

1941 births
2015 deaths
20th-century Spanish actresses
21st-century Spanish actresses
Actresses from Navarre
People from Pamplona
Spanish radio actresses
Spanish radio writers
Spanish stage actresses
Spanish television actresses
Women radio writers